Bunomys is a genus of rodent from Sulawesi and Buton Island.

Currently, eight species are recognised in two species-groups.

Species
Genus Bunomys
chrysocomus-group:
Yellow-haired hill rat, Bunomys chrysocomus Hoffmann, 1887
Heavenly hill rat, Bunomys coelestis Thomas, 1896
Long-headed hill rat, Bunomys prolatus Musser, 1991
Tana Toraja hill rat, Bunomys torajae Musser, 2014
fratrorum-group:
Fraternal hill rat, Bunomys fratrorum Thomas, 1896
Andrew's hill rat, Bunomys andrewsi J. A. Allen, 1911
Karoko hill rat, Bunomys karokophilus Musser, 2014
Inland hill rat, Bunomys penitus Miller and Hollister, 1921

References

 
Rodents of Sulawesi
Rodent genera
Taxa named by Oldfield Thomas